Saint-Martin-d'Auxigny is a commune in the Cher department in the Centre-Val de Loire region of France.

Geography

Population

Sights
 The church of St. Martin, dating from the nineteenth century.
 The ruins of the fifteenth-century chapel at the site of the Château de la Salle le Roi.
 The thirteenth-century chapel of the old priory in the forest at Bléron.

See also
Communes of the Cher department

References

External links

Official commune website 

Communes of Cher (department)